The Albania national football team has represented Albania in international association football since 1946. The Albanian Football Association (Federata Shqiptare e Futbollit; FSHF) was founded in 1930 and became a member of the Fédération Internationale de Football Association (FIFA) two years later. However, the team did not play its first official international match until 7 October 1946, suffering a 2–3 defeat to Yugoslavia in the 1946 Balkan Cup. In 1954, Albania was one of the founding members of the Union of European Football Associations (UEFA) and continues to compete as a member of the organisation, which encompasses the countries of Europe and Israel. As of November 2022, Albania have played 366 international fixtures, winning 95, drawing 77 and losing 194. They have played more fixtures against Romania than any other national side, losing 13 of the 19 matches between the sides. In global and continental competitions, the team has competed in qualification groups for both the FIFA World Cup, since 1966, and the UEFA European Championship, since 1964. The team has qualified for one international tournament during its history, UEFA Euro 2016, where they were eliminated in the group stage. In minor competitions, the team won the 1946 Balkan Cup and the 2000 Malta International Football Tournament.

As of January 2023, Albania's most capped player is Lorik Cana, who made 93 appearances for the senior team during his career. He made his international debut in June 2003 in a 2–3 defeat against Switzerland and won his final cap in June 2016 in a 1–0 victory over Romania at UEFA Euro 2016, retiring from international duty after the tournament. The nation's leading goalscorer is Erjon Bogdani, who scored 18 times during his international career between 1996 and 2013. Bogdani overtook the previous record holder, Alban Bushi, in September 2011 after scoring in three consecutive international fixtures. Bushi had claimed the record from Altin Rraklli in 2004.

The first player to reach 25 caps for Albania was Panajot Pano, who reached the total in April 1973 in a match against East Germany. Pano was later named as his country's "golden player" by the FSHF during the UEFA Jubilee Awards in 2004 as Albania's "single most outstanding player". Foto Strakosha is the most capped goalkeeper in the national team's history and held the overall cap record until 2011, when his total was surpassed by Altin Lala. The current holder, Lorik Cana, claimed the record in 2014.

Players
Appearances and goals are composed of FIFA World Cup and UEFA European Championship and each competition's required qualification matches, as well as UEFA Nations League matches and numerous international friendly tournaments and matches. Players are listed by number of caps. If the number of caps is equal, the players are then listed by time of debut. Statistics updated following match played on 19 November 2022.

Note: Albania played a friendly match against Kosovo on 13 November 2015, before Kosovo became a member of FIFA or UEFA and is not recognised as an official match by either organisation but is recognised by the FSHF. As such, the match is included from the totals in the table below and the '#1' symbol indicates which players appeared in the match.

 KOS = Withdrew to play for Kosovo.
 SUI-21 = Withdrew to play for Switzerland U21.

Notes

See also
 List of Albania international footballers (1–24 caps)
 List of Albania international footballers born outside Albania

References

External links
 Albania national football team at National-Football-Teams.com
 FSHF.org

   
Association football in Albania lists
Albania